Emerald Falls (also known as The Falls) is a 2008 telemovie starring Georgie Parker, Vince Colosimo, Geoff Morrell, Catherine McClements, and in his television debut, Thom Green. Shot in Sydney at Mount Wilga House in Hornsby with exterior shots taken in the Blue Mountains, Emerald Falls was filmed in 2007. It was written by Tim Pye and Cathy Strickland, and directed by Peter Andrikidis.

Plot
The recently divorced Joni Ferguson and her 15-year-old son Zac relocate to the Blue Mountains, where Joni has bought a run-down house and decides to open a bed and breakfast. Six months on, the local doctor is found dead in his home, and the police, along with precocious Zac, try to find out what happened to him. When the police start to question Joni about the murder, Zac tries to clear her name.

Cast
 Joni Ferguson – Georgie Parker
 Zac Ferguson – Thom Green (listed as Tom Green in the movie credits)
 Ned Montoya – Vince Colosimo
 Jack Donnelly – Geoff Morrell
 Rosalie Bailey – Catherine McClements
 Blossom Piggot – Ella Scott Lynch
 Steve Landers – Oliver Ackland
 Dr. Henry Forbes – Andrew McFarlane
 Callum Peterson – Leon Ford
 Catherine Reid – Heather Mitchell
 Paul Ferguson – Rhys Muldoon

References

External links

2008 television films
2008 films
APRA Award winners
Films shot in Sydney
Australian drama television films
Australian crime drama films